Näsbyholm Castle is a manor at Skurup Municipality  Scania, Sweden.

History
Näsbyholm was known since the 14th century as a fortified castle that was demolished 1865.    After a fire in 1955,  the current manor house was erected 1957. In 1994 the east wing was added. 

In 1744, the estate was acquired by Danish captain Christian Henrik von Finecke  who in 1756 made Näsbyholm a fideicommiss. 
Näsbyholm was the birthplace and childhood  home of the Swedish noblemen and twin brothers;  professional hunter Bror von Blixen-Finecke  (1886–1946) and equestrian Hans von Blixen-Finecke (1886–1917).

See also
List of castles in Sweden

References

External links
Näsby Slott website

 Buildings and structures in Skåne County